Jiří Hrneček (born 30 March 1929) is a Czech former sports shooter. He competed in the 25 metre pistol and the 50 metre pistol events at the 1960 Summer Olympics.

References

External links
 

1929 births
Possibly living people
People from Písek District
Czech male sport shooters
Olympic shooters of Czechoslovakia
Shooters at the 1960 Summer Olympics
Sportspeople from the South Bohemian Region